Travis Lane Fine (born June 26, 1968) is an American actor, writer, director and producer, perhaps best known for his film Any Day Now, and for his roles in Girl, Interrupted and The Young Riders.

Personal life
Fine was born in Atlanta, Georgia, the second son of Maxine Parker Makover and Terry Fine, a professional golfer. He has one older brother, Todd, and one younger sister, Kelly. His parents divorced when he was six. He was raised in Hickory Flat and Atlanta, Georgia, but moved to Los Angeles, California when he was fifteen, and has lived in that area since. In 1986, he graduated from Beverly Hills High School in Beverly Hills, California. He attended Pitzer College in Claremont, CA for 1 year and eventually earned his Aviation Science degree from Utah Valley University.

On Valentine's Day, 1993, Fine married Jessica Resnick, but the couple divorced in 1995. On June 29, 2002, he married his present wife, Kristine Fine (b. Hostetter). He has two daughters born in 1994 and 2004, and a son born in 2007. Fine is Jewish.

Career
Fine's acting career started at the age of seven when he was cast as John Henry in a stage production of Member of the Wedding at the Alliance Theatre in Atlanta. Over the next few years, he starred in numerous theatre productions, including A Christmas Carol, Peter Pan, Oliver!, Macbeth, Legend of Sleepy Hollow, On Golden Pond, Mr. Pickwick's Christmas, Tom Sawyer, Grease, and Amadeus (in which he played Mozart) – some of them in Atlanta, some at the Children's Theatre Company in Minneapolis, and the last two at Beverly Hills High School. His on-screen debut came at the age of twelve in A Time for Miracles starring Bonanza'''s Lorne Greene.

In 1989, Fine got his big break when he landed the role as mute and bald Pony Express rider Ike McSwain on ABC's new Western series The Young Riders, also starring Anthony Zerbe, Brett Cullen, Melissa Leo, Ty Miller, Josh Brolin, Stephen Baldwin, Yvonne Suhor, and Gregg Rainwater. Fine left the show early in the third and last season, when his character was killed trying to protect the girl that he loved (portrayed by guest actress Kelli Williams (Medical Investigation, The Practice)).

Since his departure from The Young Riders, Travis Fine has guest-starred on such TV shows as CSI: Crime Scene Investigation, Family Law, The Lazarus Man, JAG, Quantum Leap, and Vengeance Unlimited. He has appeared on the silver screen in highly acclaimed and award-winning movies like The Thin Red Line and Girl, Interrupted. He played a strict school leader in the film Child's Play 3, and has also starred in numerous TV movies and miniseries, including The President's Man, Shake, Rattle and Roll: An American Love Story, Menendez: A Killing in Beverly Hills (playing Erik Menendez), and Cruel Doubt.

Upon selling his first screenplay, The Lords of the Sea (written in 1994), to Howard Koch Jr., Travis Fine was hired to write episodes for Diagnosis: Murder and Dr. Quinn, Medicine Woman. In 1996, he attended the New York Film Academy, where he wrote, directed and produced several short films. A year later, he wrote, produced and directed his first feature-length film, The Others, a high school comedy.

In 2002, Fine started a new career in aviation and attended ATP flight school. In 2003, Fine became a commercial airline pilot when he was hired as a first officer flying Embraer regional jets for Chatauqua Airlines, although he said he "ha[s] not ruled out doing more acting" and he continues writing screenplays.

In the fall of 2009, Fine wrote and directed The Space Between, starring Melissa Leo, AnnaSophia Robb, Brad William Henke, Anthony Keyvan and Phillip Rhys. The film premiered at the Tribeca Film Festival, won the Grand Prize at the Heartland Film Festival and then aired on The USA Network as a commercial-free event movie on the 10th anniversary of 9/11.

In 2012, Fine co-wrote, produced and directed Any Day Now, an LGBT film set in the 1970s, starring Alan Cumming, Garret Dillahunt, Isaac Leyva, and Frances Fisher. Travis produced the film with his wife Kristine Hostetter Fine. Before its US release, Any Day Now'' won awards including:

 Chicago International Film Festival 2012 - Audience Award
 Seattle International Film Festival 2012 - Best Actor Award, Alan Cumming
 Seattle International Film Festival 2012 - Audience Award
 Tribeca Film Festival 2012 - Audience Award
 Outfest 2012 - Audience Award
 Outfest 2012 - Best Actor Award, Alan Cumming
 Provincetown International Film Festival 2012 - Audience Award
 Woodstock Film Festival 2012 - Audience Award

Filmography

References

External links

Vaya Con Dios, Ike! The Travis Fine Web Site
The Travis Fine Message Board

1968 births
American male film actors
American male television actors
Living people
Male actors from Atlanta
New York Film Academy alumni
Beverly Hills High School alumni
Commercial aviators
Jewish American male actors